The 1965 South Carolina Gamecocks football team represented the University of South Carolina as a member of the Atlantic Coast Conference (ACC) during the 1965 NCAA University Division football season. Led by Marvin Bass in his fifth and final season, the Gamecocks finished the season with an overall record of 5–5 with a mark of 4–2 in conference play, sharing the ACC title with Duke. In July 1966, the ACC ruled that South Carolina had used two ineligible players during the 1965 season and required the Gamecocks to forfeit their four conference victories and share of the conference title. Clemson and NC State, who both lost to South Carolina, had finished tied for third in the ACC with 4–3 records. After the forfeits from South Carolina, Clemson and NC State improved to 5–2 in conference play and were declared ACC co-champions. Duke dropped to third place. NCAA and South Carolina records still reflect the Gamecocks' original win–loss marks prior to the forfeits.

South Carolina played home games at Carolina Stadium in Columbia, South Carolina.

Schedule

References

South Carolina
South Carolina Gamecocks football seasons
South Carolina Gamecocks football